First Baptist Peddie Memorial Church is a historic church at Broad and Fulton Streets in Newark, Essex County, New Jersey, United States.

It was built in 1888 and added to the National Register of Historic Places in 1972.

See also 
 National Register of Historic Places listings in Essex County, New Jersey

References 

Baptist churches in New Jersey
Churches on the National Register of Historic Places in New Jersey
Churches completed in 1888
19th-century Baptist churches in the United States
Churches in Newark, New Jersey
National Register of Historic Places in Newark, New Jersey
New Jersey Register of Historic Places